Tan Sri Mohamed Nazir bin Tun Abdul Razak (born 19 November 1966) is a Malaysian banking executive. He was Chairman of CIMB Group, which is one of the largest financial services providers in Malaysia and ASEAN. He served as CEO of the group from 1999 to 2014. Nazir is the youngest son of the second Prime Minister of Malaysia Abdul Razak Hussein and brother of the sixth Prime Minister, Najib Razak.

Early life and education
Nazir was born in 1966 in Kuala Lumpur. His father died when he was 9 years and two months old (as he was turning 10 in the same year). He attended St. John's Institution and Alice Smith School and continued his secondary education at Oundle School in the United Kingdom from age 13. He obtained his Bachelor of Science in Economics and Politics from the University of Bristol and went on to obtain a Master of Philosophy in Development Economics from the University of Cambridge. In 2009, he was the Chevening Fellow at the Oxford Centre for Islamic Studies. He is of Bugis descent.

Career
After returning from the United Kingdom, Nazir joined the corporate advisory department of Commerce International Merchant Bankers Berhad in 1989. He rose to become managing director and Chief executive of the bank, which by then was known as CIMB, in 1999. His tenure as CEO ended in 2014 after he resigned and took over as chairman which he served until 2018.

During his tenure as the CEO, Nazir spearheaded CIMB Group's transformation from a boutique Malaysian investment bank to Malaysia's second-largest financial services group, the fifth largest universal bank in ASEAN, the largest Asia Pacific-based investment bank, and one of the world's largest Islamic banks.

In April 2016, Nazir took a one-month voluntary leave of absence from CIMB, while an independent review was being conducted into a $7 million transfer into his personal account from his brother, Najib, as part of the wider 1Malaysia Development Berhad scandal. After the completion of the review by CIMB Group, Razak was cleared of any wrongdoing and resumed his role as CIMB Group chairman and as a CIMB Bank director.

In addition to his role as the Chairman of CIMB, Nazir was also appointed as a Director of Khazanah Nasional Berhad (2014-2018) a member of the Investment Panel of the Employee Provident Fund (EPF) (2002-2017) and the Chairman of the EPF's Investment Panel Risk Committee.

Nazir has been a member of the International Advisory Board at the Blavatnik School of Government, University of Oxford since 2015. In October 2016, Nazir was appointed as the inaugural chair of World Economic Forum's ASEAN Regional Business Council, which aims to champion initiatives that call for trust and co-operation between the public and private sectors in the region.

Awards and accolades
During his tenure as Group managing director/chief executive officer of CIMB, Nazir has been recognised as Malaysia's top executive/CEO on several occasions. He was the youngest recipient of FinanceAsia's ‘Lifetime Achievement Award’ in 2009 and was also awarded Euromoney's 2012 ‘Outstanding Achievement Award’ in recognition of this outstanding contribution to the Asian Financial Markets.

In October 2015, Nazir Razak was honoured with Asia House Asian Business Leaders Award by Asia House for having "underlined the benefits of cooperation and partnership across Asean through his support of learning, independent research and charitable works, as well as in his ambitious business strategy, demonstrating how a commercially successful Asean-wide initiative can bring people together for the common good."

Personal life
Nazir is married to Azlina Aziz, who is the daughter of Abdul Aziz Taha, a former governor of Bank Negara Malaysia. The couple have two children, Arman and Marissa.

Filmography

Television series

Honours

Honours of Malaysia
  :
  Commander of the Order of Loyalty to the Crown of Malaysia (PSM) – Tan Sri (2021)
  :
  Grand Knight of the Order of the Crown of Pahang (SIMP) – formerly Dato', now Dato' Indera (2004)
  Grand Knight of the Order of Sultan Ahmad Shah of Pahang (SSAP) – Dato' Sri (2007)
  :
  Knight Commander of the Order of the Crown of Selangor (DPMS) – Dato' (2015)

References

External links
 

1966 births
Living people
Malaysian people of Malay descent
Malaysian people of Bugis descent
Malaysian Muslims
Malaysian businesspeople
Malaysian chairpersons of corporations
Malaysian chief executives
People educated at Oundle School
Alumni of the University of Bristol
Alumni of the University of Cambridge
Children of prime ministers of Malaysia
21st-century Malaysian businesspeople
Commanders of the Order of Loyalty to the Crown of Malaysia
Knights Commander of the Order of the Crown of Selangor